Sania Saeed (born 28 August 1972) is a Pakistani actress and television host. Works mainly in television and theatre, Saeed is the recipient of numerous accolades including two PTV Awards, three Hum Awards and four Lux Style Awards.

She first appeared on television in a street theatre play, televised for 8 March, for the program Aadhi Duniya in 1989. The play was Aurat. She was the first announcer for Network Television Marketing, Karachi center. She then appeared in Haseena Moin's serial Aahat, directed by Sahira Kazmi, followed by Anwar Maqsood's Sitara Aur Mehrunissa directed by Zark in 1991 & 1992 respectively, which shot Sania to her stardom in the Pakistani television Industry. Sania has been working in theatre and television for over two decades.

Early life and education
Sania was born on 28 August 1972 in Karachi. Her father Mansoor Saeed was a political activist and translated books, documentaries and theatre plays in Urdu and his best works include the translations of Carl Sagan's Cosmos, Jacob Bronowski's Ascent of Man and Bertolt Breckht's life of Galilio, Exception and the rule, He who says Yes and He who says No, Good Person of Schezwan and Saint Joan of the Stockyards.

Sania's mother, Abida Saeed is a Montessorian and had established Seedling Montessori School in 1983 and runs to date.

Sania did her matric from St. Joseph's Convent High School, Karachi. Intermediate from PECHS college for Women and Honours from University of Karachi, in Clinical Psychology. She married TV director Shahid Shafaat in 1998 who has directed Tau Dil Ka Kia Hua which aires on Hum TV.

Career
In the year 1982, sania's father Mansoor Saeed with other like-minded comrades established a theatre group named DASTAK.

The Dastak Experience

Dastak was very active in the struggle for democracy during the longest dictatorship in Pakistan that ended in 1988. It was doing both proscenium and Street theatre. It was a group of volunteer political activists, students, trade union workers, students, women and human rights' activists, journalists and teachers. Sania started from playing child characters, crowds and scene changers to major characters in the Urdu translations of these Dastak performances.

 The Chameleon (Chekhov)         – Girgit
 Exception and the rule. – Anokhi baat bhi mumkinhai
 Life of Galileo etc. – Galileo ki Daastan
 Interview in Buenos Aires       – Aik jalawatan se interview.

Democracy bought new tasks, and the younger lot of the group moved into street theatre, protesting against discriminatory laws against women, unemployment, unavailability of basic amenities, encouraging education, etc. and continued up to the year 1990.

The Katha Experience

In 1992, Shahid Shafaat, Sania's husband, also an active member of Dastak, assisted by other friends, conducted a workshop with the working children of Korangi with the help of PILER and Goethe Institute. This workshop evolved into a play, "Tarikyon ke saye" first performed at a local marriage hall in their home town (Korangi, an Industrial area in Karachi) and then later at Pak American Cultural Centre (PACC). The children who participated in this workshop came out a little more aware of themselves.  It is one of the rare original full length scripts that was developed from a workshop. This group formalised and is now called KATHA.

Television Experience

1989 – First appearance.
Sania as part of Dastak, was invited to perform street theatre play "AURAT" (originally written by Safdar Hashmi of Jan Natya Manch India) for PTV, they gladly accepted.  Women's issues were being given a lot of importance and several programs were being designed and presented one of which was "AADHI DUNIYA", produced by Fahmida Nasreen. The 20-min play was recorded in two days and performed by activists of Dastak.

Television

Drama serials

Webseries

Telefilms and long plays

Theater and stage plays

Talk shows

Films

Awards and nominations

References

External links
 
 
 Sania Saeed on forumpakistan.com
 Sania Saeed on urduwire.com

Pakistani television actresses
Actresses from Karachi
Pakistani television hosts
University of Karachi alumni
Pakistani stage actresses
PTV Award winners
Living people
1972 births
20th-century Pakistani actresses
21st-century Pakistani actresses
Pakistani women television presenters